Latty Township is one of the twelve townships of Paulding County, Ohio, United States.  The 2000 census found 1,026 people in the township, 614 of whom lived in the unincorporated portions of the township.

Geography
Located in the southern part of the county, it borders the following townships:
Jackson Township - north
Brown Township - northeast corner
Washington Township - east
Jackson Township, Van Wert County - southeast
Hoaglin Township, Van Wert County - south
Union Township, Van Wert County - southwest corner
Blue Creek Township - west
Paulding Township - northwest corner

The village of Grover Hill is located in southeastern Latty Township.

Name and history
It is the only Latty Township statewide.

Government
The township is governed by a three-member board of trustees, who are elected in November of odd-numbered years to a four-year term beginning on the following January 1. Two are elected in the year after the presidential election and one is elected in the year before it. There is also an elected township fiscal officer, who serves a four-year term beginning on April 1 of the year after the election, which is held in November of the year before the presidential election. Vacancies in the fiscal officership or on the board of trustees are filled by the remaining trustees.

References

External links
County website 

Townships in Paulding County, Ohio
Townships in Ohio